Lesley Sharp is an English stage, film and television actress whose roles on British television include Clocking Off (2000–2001), Bob & Rose (2001) and Afterlife (2005–2006). She was nominated for the BAFTA Award for Best Actress in a Supporting Role for the 1997 film The Full Monty. Her other film appearances include Rita, Sue and Bob Too (1986), Naked (1993), Priest (1994), From Hell (2001) and Vera Drake (2004). Between 2011 and 2016, she starred as DC Janet Scott in the ITV drama Scott & Bailey.

Early life
Sharp was born in Manchester, England to Elsie Makinson and Norman Patient, a married tram driver. She was adopted at six weeks old. Her adoptive father, Jack, was a tax inspector, and she grew up in Merseyside.

Sharp has stated that she started acting because, as a child, she felt "invisible" and did not "quite fit in". She has said that her inspiration to act came from watching Dick Emery on television.

Sharp attended the Guildhall School of Music and Drama in the class of 1982.

Career
Sharp's screen debut was in Alan Clarke's Rita, Sue and Bob Too (1986), playing Bob's wife, Michelle. She appeared in another Clarke-directed project, as Valerie in the filmed version of Jim Cartwright's successful stageplay Road (1987). Further film appearances included supporting roles in The Rachel Papers (1989) and Stephen Poliakoff's Close My Eyes, with Clive Owen and Alan Rickman. Sharp was establishing herself as a talented actress and social realist roles in Mike Leigh's Naked (1993) and the Jimmy McGovern-penned Priest (1994) further raised her profile. By the time she was in Prime Suspect 4: The Lost Child (1995) and The Full Monty (1997) she had become a well-known performer in Britain.

Although Sharp has appeared in a variety of films throughout her career, she is probably best known by television audiences. By the late 1990s, she was being offered lead roles in numerous well-written drama series. Common As Muck (1997) was followed by Playing the Field (1998–2002), a drama about a female football team which ran for five series. Sharp had supporting parts in Great Expectations (1999), as Mrs Joe, and in Nature Boy (2000), as Martha Tyler, before landing the role of Trudy Graham in Paul Abbott's BAFTA-award-winning Clocking Off (2000–2003), which lasted four series. Russell T. Davies then cast her opposite Alan Davies in Bob & Rose, which resulted in a BAFTA nomination for Sharp. Further film roles in From Hell, starring Johnny Depp, and Cheeky (1993), which was directed by Naked co-star David Thewlis, preceded another television drama written by Russell T. Davies. In The Second Coming (2003) She was "the woman who killed God" in the form of Stephen Baxter, as played by Christopher Eccleston.

Sharp again worked with Mike Leigh in Vera Drake (2004) which was followed by one-off television dramas including Planespotting, Born with Two Mothers and Our Hidden Lives, all in 2005. The same year, she played the clairvoyant lead role of Alison Mundy opposite Andrew Lincoln's sceptical Robert Bridge in ITV's supernatural drama series Afterlife. Although the subject matter was seen as quite controversial, it was generally received positively by critics and audiences. Sharp's performance was highly praised and she was nominated for several awards. She commented, in a This Morning television interview, that the guest stars – including Natalia Tena, David Threlfall and Mark Benton — for the second series "were amazing".

After a ten-year break from stagework, in October 2005 Sharp return to the theatre as Emma in Sam Shepard's The God of Hell at the Donmar Warehouse. In what she described as "a black comedy about the poison at the heart of America", she was directed by her friend Kathy Burke — someone with whom she had previously competed for screen roles.
Lesley Sharp concentrated on theatrical work for the next few years, until re-appearing on television screens in 2008 in the three-part Lucy Gannon-penned drama The Children. Later in 2008, she worked with Russell T. Davies for a third time when she played Sky Silvestry in the Doctor Who episode "Midnight". Davies later tipped Sharp to become the first woman to play the Doctor.

In early 2009 Sharp played Petronella van Daan in the BBC's new version of The Diary of Anne Frank. She subsequently played Paddy Considine's wife in Channel 4's acclaimed drama series Red Riding. Sharp starred in a 2009 revival of The Rise and Fall of Little Voice at the Vaudeville Theatre with Marc Warren and Diana Vickers, which ran from October to the following January. Between 2011 and 2016, Sharp co-starred as Janet Scott in ITV1's crime drama series Scott & Bailey. In May 2012 she starred in the Sky1 comedy series Starlings as Jan Starling.

In 2015, Sharp played the part of Mary, the daughter of Petunia Howe, in the three-part BBC series Capital based on John Lanchester's novel of the same name.

She appeared in several episodes of the Netflix original Fate: The Winx Saga as Rosalind but was replaced in this role with Miranda Richardson after the first season.

In 2021 she took the lead role in Kae Tempest’s Philoctetes at the National Theatre.

Personal life
Sharp married Nicholas Gleaves in 1994. They have two children.

Filmography

Television

Film

Theatre
In October 2005, Sharp starred in her first theatre role for a decade in the play The God of Hell at the Donmar Warehouse, London.

In 2008, she played the lead character in the play Harper Regan at Royal National Theatre.

In 2014, she played the character Helen in the play A Taste of Honey at Royal National Theatre.

Awards and nominations

References and notes

External links
 Lesley Sharp at the British Film Institute

Alumni of the Guildhall School of Music and Drama
English adoptees
English film actresses
English stage actresses
English television actresses
Outstanding Performance by a Cast in a Motion Picture Screen Actors Guild Award winners
People from Formby
Royal Shakespeare Company members
Actresses from Liverpool
Living people
20th-century English actresses
21st-century English actresses
Actresses from Manchester
1960 births